Rajko's Cave (Rajkova pećina) is a cave near the copper and gold mines of Majdanpek in eastern Serbia.

See also 
 List of caves in Serbia
 The Longest Caves And Pits In Serbia
 Rajko's Cave

References

Caves of Serbia